Tages formed in May 1963 as a duo and quickly expanded into quintet, though no music by them would be released until more than a year later, when their debut single "Sleep Little Girl" was released in October 1964. Up until October 1968, 23 singles by the group were released, though six of those were unauthorized. Out of these singles, 13 managed to reach both Kvällstoppen and Tio i Topp while two further singles only reached Tio I Topp. In 1969, the band changed their name to Blond and three further singles were released between July 1969 and July 1970, out of which one reached Tio i Topp. Combined under both names, the band released in total 27 singles between October 1964 and July 1970.

Between September 1964 and January 1967, the group was signed to Platina Records, an independent record label run by Evert Jakobsson. With the label, the group released three studio albums. Dissatisfied with the label's economical status, they waited until their contract expired, which it did on New Year's Day 1967. They then promptly signed with Parlophone Records, who, with a bigger budget, could afford to give the group more time in the studio. This resulted in another two albums, Contrast and Studio, both released in 1967. The group's final album The Lilac Years was issued under the name Blond after they had received a contract with Fontana Records in 1969. In the UK, the group had releases on four different labels, His Master's Voice, Columbia Records, Parlophone and MGM Records.

Studio albums

Compilations

Extended plays

Singles

Swedish singles

Other contributions

Videography

References 
Notes

References

Sources 
 

Discographies of Swedish artists
Rock music group discographies
Pop music discographies